The Regina is a Swedish model of electric multiple unit passenger train, manufactured by Bombardier Transportation (formerly Adtranz). It is used by the national passenger railway SJ along with numerous regional and private operators, in variants designated X50, X51, X52, X53, X54 and X55, and in two-, three-, and four-carriage models. The Regina units are short trains built for local and regional service. The car body is built of stainless steel, with only bolsters and coupler pockets made of mild steel. A variant of the Regina is used in China as the CRH1. Unlike X 2000, Regina trainsets are corrugateless due to eliminate molybdenum content and add titanium instead.

X55, new high-speed train
In late 2007 it was announced that SJ were ordering twenty units furnished for inter-city service. These trains, designated X55 (also marketed as SJ 3000), were delivered during 2011 and 2012, and are used on the routes connecting Stockholm with destinations like Sundsvall, Karlstad and Falun, allowing the displaced X 2000 units to be used instead to lengthen the busy trains running to Gothenburg and Malmö. These units are four-carriage trains with a first-class section and an on-board bistro; four-across seating. There is an option for another 20 units.

Gallery

See also
 List of high-speed trains
 China Railways CRH1

References

External links

Regina official site
Gröna tåget project
Järnväg.net Regina page 

Bombardier Transportation multiple units
High-speed trains of Sweden
Multiple units of Sweden
SJ multiple units
Passenger trains running at least at 200 km/h in commercial operations
2000 establishments in Sweden
15 kV AC multiple units